Aliaksandr Tsitou (born 28 October 1986) is a Belarusian handball player for Riihimäki Cocks and the Belarusian national team.

References

1986 births
Living people
Belarusian male handball players
People from Mogilev
Expatriate handball players in Poland
Belarusian expatriate sportspeople in Finland
Belarusian expatriate sportspeople in Poland
Belarusian expatriate sportspeople in Ukraine
HC Motor Zaporizhia players
Sportspeople from Mogilev Region